The New Zealand Cup for standardbred horses, also known as either the New Zealand Trotting Cup or the New Zealand Pacing Cup is a Group One (G1) harness race held annually by the New Zealand Metropolitan Trotting Club at Addington Raceway in Christchurch, New Zealand.

It is generally considered the country's most prestigious harness racing event.

The race is held during Show Week on the second Tuesday in November, three days before the Show Day public holiday. The New Zealand Free For All is held on Show Day. The public holiday in Christchurch is the observance of the Canterbury Anniversary Holiday (16 December in reality). The race meeting, along with the New Zealand Cup for thoroughbreds and greyhounds, forms part of Canterbury's carnival week, along with the Canterbury Agricultural and Pastoral Show. Until 1999, the A&P show was held at showgrounds adjacent to Addington Raceway.

The New Zealand Trotting cup is considered as Canterbury's biggest day on its social calendar.  Many flock to Addington for the glitz and glamour of the event, rather than the horse racing.

Cup history

Three horses have won the race three times, they are Indianapolis, False Step and Terror To Love. False Step later went to the United States where he beat the acknowledged American champion of the time, Adios Butler. A number of horses have won the race twice including Harold Logan and Highland Fling who both won their second cups off the very large handicap of 60 yards and Lazarus.

In 1929, 1930 and 1931 the New Zealand Cup was run with heats: a first division  and second division and then the final.

The 1962 New Zealand Cup days was one of the few days when there has been rain on the Cup day.  This was the year that Lordship beat the hot favorite Cardigan Bay.

In 1963 Cardigan Bay who is arguably New Zealand's greatest ever horse won the Cup and also won the Inter Dominion in Australia. Cardigan Bay, in association with New Jersey master reinsman Stanley Dancer went on to become the first million dollar winner in the sport's history.

A common feature of the race is the inclusion of Australian trained runners, including the winners:
 Steel Jaw in 1983, 
 Lightning Blue in 1987, and
 Arden Rooney in 2015.

The 2008 running of the race was won by Changeover, driven by David Butcher and trained by Geoff Small, in a then race/world record time (1.58.8-mile rate). The race was delayed by over 6 minutes due to fractious horses and a damaged wheel to one of the favoured runners. After being slow away, Butcher moved forward to lead, and soon after took a trail behind one of the other favourites, Baileys Dream. In an exciting finish, Butcher used the passing lane to pass Baileys Dream, with Report for Duty third for Anthony Butt (who was trying for 3 wins in a row in the NZ Cup). It was another dream result for the ATC Trotting Syndicate, who own the horse. The last horse home, favoured runner Monkey King, was credited with a time of 3.58.7, which was fast enough to have won every prior NZ Cup, except the 2007 running, won by Flashing Red.

Terror To Love equaled the record for most wins in 2013, having won the previous two years. Despite breaking stride at the start of the race, giving the leaders a 15-length head start (about 37m or 3 seconds), Terror To Love made up the distance slowly and worked towards the front, taking the lead in the back stretch of the final lap. The horse managed to hold off late-charging runners to record the unusual win by a head. The race announcer called the race the greatest win in the New Zealand Trotting Cup's history. At the time it was the second fastest New Zealand Cup, behind the 2008 win by Changeover.

The 2015 running of the New Zealand Cup was won by Australian-based horse, Arden Rooney, driven by Kerryn Manning. It was the first time in the history of the race that a female had driven the winner. After a great start, Arden Rooney was given a leisurely time in front and with a last half-mile in 55 seconds under a vigorous drive, gave little else a chance to catch it. Subsequently, the driver was given a two-week suspension and $1000 fine for "Excessive use of whip". It was her second fine for a similar offense in New Zealand within 8 days.

In 2016 the race was run and won by the dominant Purdon/Rasmussen training combination, with their champion horse Lazarus. It was won in a very fast time in completely dominant fashion by 10 lengths, running 3.53.1 for the 2-mile event (a mile rate of 1.57.2). The Purdon/Rasmussen combination filled 3 of the first 4 finishing positions. Lazarus returned to win the Cup the following year.

In 2016, the ZM Body Art final was held at the Trotting Cup.

New Zealand Cup day will generally attract over 20,000 people at the race course. However, in 2021 the crowd was unable to attend due to COVID-19 restrictions.

Stake money

The stake or total prize money for the New Zealand Cup has fluctuated over the years:

 1940 – 2500 pounds
 1950 – 7500 pounds
 1960 – 6750 pounds
 1970 - $25,000
 1980 - $100,000
 1990 - $375,000
 2008 - $1.2 million 
 2009 - $1 million 
 2010 - $750,000
 2011 and 2012 - $600,000 
 2013 - $650,000
 2020 - $540,000
 2021 - $631,500

Records
Most wins:
 3 - Terror To Love (2011, 2012, 2013)
 3 - False Step (1958, 1959, 1960)
 3 - Indianapolis (1934, 1935, 1936)

Most wins by a driver:
 7 - Ricky May (1989, 1997, 2005, 2009, 2010, 2012, 2013)
 6 - Cecil Devine (1951, 1956, 1958, 1959, 1960, 1979)
 6 - Mark Purdon (1995, 1996, 2014, 2016, 2017, 2020)
 4 - James “Scotty” Bryce (1916, 1925, 1926, 1933)
 4 - Todd Mitchell (1999, 2002, 2003, 2004)
 4 - Peter Wolfenden (1963, 1965, 1970, 1977)

Race results 

The following are the winners and place getters.

* won the New Zealand Free For All same year

Other associated races 

The horses that contest the New Zealand Cup often compete in various traditional lead in races.  The winner of the New Zealand Cup is usually one that wins or performs strongly in these races.

On the Friday following the New Zealand Cup, Canterbury Anniversary day, many of the same horses will contest the New Zealand Free For All.

Top horses who did not win the New Zealand Cup 

The list of New Zealand Cup winners includes many of the best horses New Zealand has produced as well as some great Australian horses. However, some very distinguished horses that have attempted but failed to win the Cup include:

 Auckland Reactor
 Caduceus
 Delightful Lady
 Elsu
 Master Musician
 Robin Dundee
 Roydon Glen
 Smoken Up
 Tiger Tara
 Young Quinn

See also 

 Harness racing
 Harness racing in New Zealand
 Auckland Trotting Cup
 New Zealand Free For All
 Great Northern Derby
 New Zealand Trotting Derby
 Dominion Handicap
 Rowe Cup
 Noel J Taylor Mile
 New Zealand Messenger
 Inter Dominion Pacing Championship
 Inter Dominion Trotting Championship
 Miracle Mile Pace

References 

 http://www.hrnz.co.nz
 http://www.tab.co.nz
 http://www.nzcupandshow.co.nz/2006/ChristchurchCasinoNewZealandTrottingCupDay.asp
 https://web.archive.org/web/20100814015637/http://www.ers.dol.govt.nz/holidays_act_2003/dates/2006_9.html

External links
 Full Details of all races
 2008 Cup race replay - Changeover

Australasian Grand Circuit Races
Harness racing in New Zealand
Horse races in New Zealand
New Zealand Trotting Cup winners